Pickens County is located in the northwest part of the U.S. state of South Carolina. As of the 2020 census, its population was 131,404. Its county seat is Pickens. The county was created in 1826. It is part of the Greenville-Anderson-Mauldin, SC Metropolitan Statistical Area.

History
Pickens County was part of Cherokee homeland territory until well after the American Revolution. The Cherokee had allied with the British, hoping to gain expulsion of European-American settlers from their lands. But they were defeated in local battles of the Revolution and forced to cede their lands under various treaties.

This former Cherokee territory was included in the new state's Ninety-Six Judicial District. In 1791 the state legislature established Washington District, a judicial area composed of present-day Greenville, Anderson, Pickens, and Oconee counties (the latter was not organized until 1868); at that time it also included Pendleton County.

Streets for the county seat and courthouse town of Pickensville (near present-day Easley) were laid off. New buildings perhaps included a large wooden hotel, which served as a stagecoach stop. In 1798 Washington District was divided into Greenville and Pendleton districts. The latter included what eventually became Anderson, Oconee, and Pickens counties. After a new courthouse was erected at Pendleton to accommodate the Court of General Sessions and Common Pleas, Pickensville began to decline.

In view of the growing population and poor transportation facilities in Pendleton District, the legislature divided it into counties in 1826. But a year later, it decided to establish judicial districts instead. The legislation went into effect in 1828. The lower part became Anderson and the upper Pickens, named in honor of Brigadier General Andrew Pickens of the American Revolution. His home, Hopewell, was on the southern border of the district. A courthouse was established on the west bank of the Keowee River, and a small town called Pickens Court House soon developed here. Since 1825, John C. Calhoun made his home in what became Pickens County, at Fort Hill, which became the basis around which Clemson University would later grow up.

By 1860 Pickens District had a population of more than 19,000 persons, of whom 22 percent were enslaved African Americans. The district was largely rural and agricultural, with cotton the most important commodity crop. Its small industry consisted mainly of sawmills, gristmills, and a few other shops producing goods for home consumption. The district's Protestant churches were numerous, but schools were few. The Blue Ridge Railroad reached the district in September 1860. There was little organized troop combat here during the Civil War, but the district was frequently plundered by marauders and deserters who swept down from the mountains.

Post-Civil War to present
After the war, the region was largely destitute. The South Carolina Constitutional Convention of 1868, meeting during the first year of Congressional Reconstruction, changed the name "district" to "county" throughout the state. The Convention also organized Oconee County, from a portion of Pickens District that was west of the Keowee and Seneca rivers, plus a small area around the Fort Hill estate formerly belonging to statesman John C. Calhoun. In the 1960s, this small area around the Calhoun property was transferred to Pickens County.

A new courthouse for Pickens County was erected at its present location. Many of the residents of Old Pickens, on the Keowee River, moved to the newly created town, some relocating their dismantled homes. The loss of the Oconee area greatly reduced the population of Pickens County. It did not again reach 19,000 until 1900.

The county's growth was accelerated by the building of the Atlanta and Charlotte Air Line Railway (later called the Southern Railway) in the 1870s. The town of Easley, named for General W. K. Easley, was chartered in 1874. The towns of Liberty and Central sprang up along the railroad about the same time and were soon incorporated. Calhoun (now part of Clemson) was founded in the 1890s, to be followed in the early 1900s by Six Mile and Norris as incorporated areas.

A major factor in Pickens County's growth was the development of the regional textile industry, which had earlier been based in New England and New York. The county's first modern cotton mill, organized by D. K. Norris and others, was established at Cateechee in 1895. By 1900 the county boasted three cotton mills, two railroads, three banks, three roller mills, 37 sawmills, ten shingle mills, and four brickyards.

Yet until 1940, with a population of 37,000 (13.2 percent black), the county remained primarily rural and agricultural. Like many other Piedmont counties, Pickens had a one-crop economy. Its citizens were engaged mainly in growing cotton or manufacturing it into cloth. A notable change in the Pickens landscape was the coming of paved highways; one completed across the county, about 1930, ran from Greenville to Walhalla by way of Easley, Liberty, and Central.

The most significant developments in the county's history have occurred since World War II. By 1972 there were 99 manufacturing plants in the county, employing almost 15,000 personnel and producing not only textiles but a wide variety of other products. The population today is estimated to be 93,894 residents. New residents continue to be attracted to Pickens County because of its climate, industrial opportunity, proximity to Greenville's labor market, and scenic beauty.

Geography

The county also contains the highest natural point in South Carolina, Sassafras Mountain, with an elevation of 3560 feet (1085 m). Table Rock State Park is in Pickens County.

Pickens County is in the Savannah River basin, the Saluda River basin, and the French Broad River basin.

State and local protected areas/sites 
 Cateechee Point: A Pickens County Park
 Hagood Mill Historic Site
 Jocassee Gorges Wilderness Area
 Keowee-Toxaway State Park
 Long Shoals Roadside Park
 Meadow Falls
 Nine Times Forest
 Nine Times Preserve
 Pinnacle Mountain
 Poe Creek State Forest
 Table Rock State Park
 Twelve Mile Recreation Area

Major water bodies 
 Lake Hartwell
 Lake Jocassee
 Lake Keowee
 Keowee River
 South Saluda River
 Table Rock Reservoir

Adjacent counties
 Transylvania County, North Carolina – north
 Greenville County – east
 Anderson County – south
 Oconee County – west

Major highways

Major infrastructure 
 Clemson Station
 Pickens County Airport

Demographics

2020 census

As of the 2020 United States census, there were 131,404 people, 48,203 households, and 31,630 families residing in the county.

2010 census
As of the 2010 United States Census, there were 119,224 people, 45,228 households, and 29,540 families residing in the county. The racial makeup of the county was 88.7% white, 6.6% black or African American, 1.6% Asian, 0.2% American Indian, 1.4% from other races, and 1.5% from two or more races. Those of Hispanic or Latino origin made up 3.1% of the population. In terms of ancestry,

Of the 45,228 households, 30.0% had children under the age of 18 living with them, 50.0% were married couples living together, 10.8% had a female householder with no husband present, 34.7% were non-families, and 25.2% of all households were made up of individuals. The average household size was 2.48 and the average family size was 2.95. The median age was 34.9 years.

The median income for a household in the county was $41,898 and the median income for a family was $53,911. Males had a median income of $41,615 versus $31,464 for females. The per capita income for the county was $20,647. About 8.9% of families and 16.6% of the population were below the poverty line, including 18.3% of those under age 18 and 7.8% of those age 65 or over.

2000 census
As of the census of 2000, there were 110,757 people, 41,306 households, and 28,459 families residing in the county.  The population density was 223 people per square mile (86/km2).  There were 46,000 housing units at an average density of 93 per square mile (36/km2).  The racial makeup of the county was 90.27% White, 6.82% Black or African American, 0.16% Native American, 1.18% Asian, 0.01% Pacific Islander, 0.70% from other races, and 0.85% from two or more races.  1.70% of the population were Hispanic or Latino of any race. 27.9% were of American, 11.8% English, 11.6% Irish, 10.3% German and 5.0% Scotch-Irish ancestry according to Census 2000.

There were 41,306 households, out of which 31.20% had children under the age of 18 living with them, 55.60% were married couples living together, 9.40% had a female householder with no husband present, and 31.10% were non-families. 23.30% of all households were made up of individuals, and 8.20% had someone living alone who was 65 years of age or older.  The average household size was 2.50 and the average family size was 2.95.

In the county, the population was spread out, with 22.30% under the age of 18, 17.50% from 18 to 24, 27.60% from 25 to 44, 21.20% from 45 to 64, and 11.40% who were 65 years of age or older.  The median age was 33 years. For every 100 females, there were 99.60 males.  For every 100 females age 18 and over, there were 98.20 males.

The median income for a household in the county was $36,214, and the median income for a family was $44,507. Males had a median income of $31,795 versus $22,600 for females. The per capita income for the county was $17,434.  About 7.80% of families and 13.70% of the population were below the poverty line, including 12.20% of those under age 18 and 11.70% of those age 65 or over.

Law, government, and public safety

Police
The Pickens County Sheriff's Office is the largest law enforcement agency in the county, and provides its services to all unincorporated areas of the county, incorporated communities without a police department, and may assist a city or town police department upon request by the department. The sheriff's office consists of the command staff, administrative support division, uniform patrol division, detective division, and judicial services division.  Within these divisions are the uniform patrol unit, the chaplain unit, special victims unit, sex offender unit, forensics unit, special operations unit, general investigations unit, animal enforcement unit, school resource officers unit, victim services unit, marine patrol unit, aviation unit, K-9 unit, professional standards unit, civil process unit, training unit, records unit, communications unit, detention unit, transport unit, court security unit, community action team, and special weapons and tactics team.  The sheriff's office is headquartered at the Pickens County Law Enforcement Center in Pickens.  The Pickens County Detention Center is a stand alone facility located in Pickens that is also managed by the sheriff's office. The sheriff's office has a total of 199 full and part-time personnel.  The current sheriff is Rick Clark.

The City of Easley Police Department is the second largest law enforcement agency in the county, and provides its services to persons living within the city limits of Easley. The department consists of an administration division, uniform patrol division, and detective division. There are 42 police officers and 3 civilians working for the department. The department is headquartered at the Easley Law Enforcement Center in downtown Easley. The current chief of police is Stan Whitten.

The City of Pickens Police Department provides its services to persons living within the city limits of Pickens. The department is headquartered at the Pickens Police Station next to the Pickens Fire Station. The current chief of police is Randall Beach.

The City of Clemson Police Department provides its services to persons living within the city limits of Clemson. The department is headquartered at the Clemson Law Enforcement Center. The current chief of police is Jimmy Dixon.

The City of Liberty Police Department provides its services to persons living within the city limits of Liberty. The department is headquartered at Liberty Town Hall in downtown Liberty. The current chief of police is Adam Gilstrap.

The Town of Central Police Department provides its services to persons living within the town limits of Central. The department consists of the chief of police, an investigative sergeant, training sergeant, five officers, and a victims advocate/administrative assistant. The department's headquarters are located in downtown Central.

The Clemson University Police Department provides its services to the Clemson University campus.  The current police chief is Greg Mullen.

The South Carolina Highway Patrol provides its services on all roads, highways, and interstate highways in the county. There is one SCHP barracks in Pickens County, Post B, serving both Oconee and Pickens counties. Post B falls under SCHP Troop 3. (Oconee/Pickens/Anderson/Greenville/Spartanburg counties)

Fire safety
There is no countywide fire department, but several communities in the county do maintain their own fire departments.

 Easley Fire Department
 Liberty Fire Department
 Pickens Fire Department
 Central Fire Department
 Clemson University Fire Department
 Dacusville Rural Fire Department
 Central Rural Fire Department
 Crosswell Fire Department
 Six Mile Fire Department
 Norris Fire Department

Politics 
Pickens County was one of the first areas of South Carolina to turn Republican. It has gone Republican all but twice since 1952, and at all times since 1980. Jimmy Carter's narrow win in 1976 is the last time that a Democrat has won even 40 percent of the county's vote. Despite this, Democrats held most state and local offices well into the 1990s.

Since 2000, it has been the most Republican county in the state, with the GOP taking 70+ percent of the vote each time. In 2008, it was the only county in the state to give John McCain over 70% of the vote.

Education

School districts
Pickens School District ranked the highest in the state with an "A−" transparency score from Sunshine Review.

Schools

 Forest Acres Elementary-Easley
 Crosswell Elementary-Easley
 West End Elementary-Easley
 East End Elementary-Easley
 McKissick Elementary-Easley
 Pickens Elementary-Pickens
 Hagood Elementary-Pickens
 Ambler Elementary-Pickens
 Clemson Elementary-Clemson
 Liberty Elementary-Liberty
 Chastain Road Elementary-Liberty
 Central Elementary-Central
 Dacusville Elementary-Dacusville
 Six Mile Elementary-Six Mile
 R.H. Gettys Middle-Easley
 Pickens Middle-Pickens
 R.C. Edwards Middle-Central
 Liberty Middle-Liberty
 Dacusville Middle-Dacusville
 Easley High School- Easley
 Pickens High School- Pickens
 D.W. Daniel High-Central
 Liberty High-Liberty

Colleges and universities
 Clemson University
 Southern Wesleyan University

Public library
Pickens County is served by the Pickens County Library System, headquartered in Easley, with four branch libraries in the county.

Communities

Cities
 Clemson (partly in Anderson County)
 Easley (largest city, partly in Anderson County)
 Liberty
 Pickens (county seat)

Towns
 Central
 Norris
 Six Mile

Census-designated places
 Arial
 Cateechee
 Clemson University
 Dacusville

Unincorporated communities

 Nine Times
 Pumpkintown
 Rocky Bottom
 Sunset

Notable people

 Bobby Baker, scandal-plagued Secretary to the Majority Leader of the Senate until 1963
 Charles H. Barker, awarded a Medal of Honor for his actions in the Korean War
 Benjy Bronk, in-studio joke writer and on-air persona for the Howard Stern Show
 John C. Calhoun, influential politician of the first half of the nineteenth century 
 DeAndre Hopkins, wide receiver for the Arizona Cardinals of the NFL
 Shoeless Joe Jackson, baseball player, born July 16, 1888; closely associated with the Black Sox Scandal in 1919
 Stanley Morgan, former NFL wide receiver who played for the New England Patriots; was born in Easley on February 17, 1955; member of the New England Patriots Hall of Fame
 Ray Robinson Williams, blind lawyer and state senator
 Sam Wyche, former NFL football player and coach, resident

See also
 List of counties in South Carolina
 National Register of Historic Places listings in Pickens County, South Carolina
 South Carolina State Parks
 List of South Carolina state forests

References

External links

 
 

 
1826 establishments in South Carolina
Populated places established in 1826
Upstate South Carolina
Counties of Appalachia